Brickwood is both a surname and a given name. Notable people with the name include:

Edwin Brickwood (1837–1906), British rower
John Brickwood (disambiguation)
Brickwood Galuteria, member of the Hawaii State Senate

See also
Brickwood baronets, a British baronetcy